Lake Stanley, also called the Stanley unconformity, is a postglacial freshwater lake that occupied part of what is now the basin of Lake Huron during a hydrologically significant period from 10,000 years Before Present (B.P.).  The lake’s surface level was approximately 70 meters below the current lake’s water surface.

The lake, although geographically smaller than the current Lake Huron, was fed from a large Lake Chippewa watershed that included the basin of what is now Lake Michigan.  During this period, the water from Lake Stanley drained through an outlet or outlets adjacent to what is now North Bay, Ontario.

Research
The lake’s now-submerged shoreline has enabled some research to be done into ecological conditions during this time period.  Research, published in 2009, described placements of stones near a section of Lake Stanley shoreline that could be interpreted as hunting infrastructure; authors O’Shea and Mathews suggested that the stones, now underwater, could have been gathered and placed as “drive lanes” to force or entice migratory caribou into a human ambush.

Lake Stanley was, however, short-lived.  Starting about 8,500  B.P., the geological conditions that had created Lake Stanley underwent a series of changes.  North of a geological “tilt line,” the subsurface terrain of the Canadian Shield, no longer weighed down by glacial ice, rebounded and closed off the North Bay outflow.  “Rising water in the Lake Huron basin inundated the Mackinac Straits after 8,150 yr B.P.”, ending the existence of Lake Stanley and later creating the present-day Lake Michigan-Lake Huron lake complex.

References

Former lakes of the United States
Geological history of the Great Lakes
Proglacial lakes
Lake Huron
Glacial lakes of the United States